Kaliszans are members of an ethnographic group of Polish people from the Kalisz Region, located within the Greater Poland Voivodeship, Poland. They are part of the bigger ethnographic group of Greater Poland people.

Notes

References 

Kalisz
Greater Poland
Lechites
Polish people
Slavic ethnic groups
Ethnic groups in Poland
Polish culture
Polish traditions
Greater Poland Voivodeship